Braúna or Brauna  may refer to:
 the name of the timber from the Brazilian tree Melanoxylum brauna Schott (fam. Fabaceae)
 an alternative name for quebracho wood from Schinopsis spp (fam. Anacardiaceae) in Brazil
 Braúna, a municipality in São Paulo, Brazil
 1411 Brauna, a Main belt asteroid